was a Japanese pop unit under the Hello! Project umbrella consisting of Aya Matsuura and former Morning Musume member Miki Fujimoto. This pairing was announced mid June 2006. Previously, Matsuura and Fujimoto worked together in the one-off group Gomattou with Maki Goto.

According to Hello! Project producer Tsunku, the term GAM stands for "Great Aya and Miki". After GAM's debut, Tsunku has decided to keep the group permanent instead of a one-time deal. However, Fujimoto and Matsuura graduating from Hello! Project in March 2009, the group subsequently disbanded.

History 
On September 13, 2006 their first single "Thanks!" was released in Japan and made its debut at number two on the Oricon Daily Ranking chart. The single made its debut—and peak—the following week at number five in the Oricon Weekly Ranking chart. The song has so far stayed in the top 200 for five weeks.

Their second single, was released October 18, 2006 making its debut at number five on the Oricon Daily Ranking chart the same day. The Ninki weekly singles chart ranked "Melodies" as the fourth most anticipated new release of the week. In iTunes Store Japan, the PV for this song was ranked number one on the Top Music Videos list, presumably ranked by sales, as of November 3, 2006. "Melodies" features a more mature theme and contains several scenes implying an almost sexual relationship between the two singers, such as the near kiss sequence featured in the televised form of the PV; just as the two of them are about to kiss the video comes to an abrupt end. The complete version of the PV released on the DVD showed that the two singers had actually kissed at the end of the video. Due to this, they have been compared to the Russian pop duo t.A.T.u. and dubbed among some listeners as the "Japanese t.A.T.u.".

Additionally, on the evening of the 28th of an uncertain month, Matsuura officially revealed her desire to go on a tour as part of GAM. Though her partner agreed, Fujimoto commented on how the group would need to record more original songs in order to do such a thing. Eventually, both members requested an album from producer Tsunku.

A third single, entitled Lu Lu Lu was released on March 21, 2007. Three days later, "Daisuki Rakuten Eagles" was released as a theme song of the baseball team Tohoku Rakuten Golden Eagles—the third Hello! Project song to do so.

Members

Discography

Albums

Singles

Single V DVD

Concerts 
GAM 1st Concert Tour 2007 Shoka Natsu ~Great Aya & Miki~ – 29 August 2007

Notes and references

External links 
 Hello! Project official website: Official profile, GAM announcement
 GAM's discography at the Up-Front Works official website

Japanese girl groups
Japanese idol groups
Japanese pop music groups
Musical groups established in 2006
Hello! Project groups
Musical groups from Tokyo
Musical groups disestablished in 2009
2006 establishments in Japan
2009 disestablishments in Japan
Japanese musical duos